Kuijt, Kuyt, Cuijt or Cuyt ([ˈkœyt]) is a Dutch surname that may refer to the following notable people:
Annie Cuyt (born 1956), Belgian computational mathematician
Dirk Kuyt (born 1980), Dutch football player
Evert Kuijt (1939–2021), Dutch writer and translator
 Job Kuijt (born 1930), Canadian botanist

Dutch-language surnames